Kendriya Vidyalaya, Sunjuwan, is a school in Jammu and part of the Kendriya Vidyalayas in India. It was started on 8 August in 1988. The school is affiliated to the Central Board of Secondary Education. The school has classes from I to XII.

Security 

Due to the presence of an Army camp, the area has witnessed two major terror attacks, one in the year 2003 and one in the year 2018.

References

See also 

 Central Board of Secondary Education
 Kendriya Vidyalaya
 List of Kendriya Vidyalayas
 NCERT

Kendriya Vidyalayas
Primary schools in India
High schools and secondary schools in Jammu and Kashmir
Educational institutions established in 1988
1988 establishments in Jammu and Kashmir